Messieurs les enfants is a 1997 French comedy film, directed by Pierre Boutron.

Plot
Caught out by their French teacher, Joseph, Igor and Nourdine end up with punishment for the following topic: "You wake up one morning and you see that in the night, you were transformed into adults. Completely distraught, you rush into your parent's room. They were transformed in children. Tell result." Unfortunately for them, the subject will become reality.

Cast

 Pierre Arditi as Joseph Piritzkt / Pope Piritzky
 François Morel as Igor Laforgue / Pierre Laforgue
 Zinedine Soualem as Nourdine Kader / Ismaël Kader
 Catherine Jacob as Yolande
 Jean-Louis Richard as Albert Crastaing
 Michel Aumont as The principal
 Anne Jacquemin as Tatiana
 Nozha Khouadra as Rachida Kader
 Nathalie Auffret as Moune
 Jean-Claude Leguay as Eric
 Claire Borotra as Agnès
 Rose-Marie Scheffler as Madame Lehmann
 Valérie Vogt as Arlette
 Philippe Khorsand as The bailiff
 Tonino Benacquista as The superintendent
 Daniel Pennac & Pierre Boutron as The men in the car

References

External links

1997 films
1990s French-language films
1997 comedy films
French comedy films
Films about rapid human age change
1990s French films